SAP NetWeaver is a software stack for many of SAP SE's applications. The SAP NetWeaver Application Server, sometimes referred to as WebAS, is the runtime environment for the SAP applications and all of the mySAP Business Suite runs on SAP WebAS: supplier relationship management (SRM), customer relationship management (CRM), supply chain management (SCM), product lifecycle management (PLM), enterprise resource planning (ERP), transportation management system (TMS).

The product is marketed as a service-oriented architecture for enterprise application integration. It can be used for custom development and integration with other applications and systems, and is built primarily using the ABAP programming language, but also uses C, C++, and Java.  It can also be extended with, and interoperate with, technologies such as Microsoft .NET, Java EE, and IBM WebSphere.

History
The NetWeaver platform was a portal technology developed by Israeli software company TopTier Software (founded in 1997), and which SAP acquired in 2001.  The founder of TopTier Software, Shai Agassi, joined SAP and was given responsibility for the company's overall technology strategy and execution. He initiated the development of the integration and application platform that became the NetWeaver platform.

SAP announced the first release, NetWeaver 2004, in January 2003, and it was made available on March 31, 2004.

NetWeaver 7.0, also known as 2004s, was made available on October 24, 2005. The latest available release is SAP NetWeaver 7.5 SP 19.

 SAP NetWeaver Application Server
 SAP NetWeaver Business Intelligence
 SAP NetWeaver Composition Environment (CE)
 SAP NetWeaver Enterprise Portal (EP)
 SAP NetWeaver Identity Management (IdM)
 SAP NetWeaver Master Data Management (MDM)
 SAP NetWeaver Mobile
 SAP NetWeaver Process Integration (PI)

SAP has also worked with the computer hardware vendors HP, IBM, Fujitsu and Sun Microsystems (which was later acquired by Oracle Corporation) to deliver hardware and software for the deployment of NetWeaver components.  Examples of these appliances include BW Accelerator and Enterprise Search.

Development tools for NetWeaver include ABAP Workbench (SE80), SAP NetWeaver Developer Studio (NWDS) based on Eclipse for most of the Java part of the technology (Web Dynpro for Java, JEE, Java Dictionary, portal applications etc.), SAP NetWeaver Development Infrastructure (NWDI) and Visual Composer.

SAP Central Process Scheduling 
SAP Central Process Scheduling by Redwood (SAP CPS), is an event-driven process scheduler incorporated into SAP ERP components.

SAP CPS is a component of SAP NetWeaver. It was designed to centrally automate and manage background processes and automate business applications running on SAP NetWeaver. These applications include SAP Solution Manager and SAP Closing Cockpit, which use the SAP CPS component with cross-system and non-SAP applications.  SAP Business Process Automation (BPA) is a new rebranded solution that replaces SAP Central Process Scheduling by Redwood.

See also
 BRFplus
 SAP Composite Application Framework – an environment for designing and using composite applications
 Web Dynpro

References

 Steffen Karch, Loren Heilig: SAP NetWeaver Roadmap. Galileo Press, 2005,

External links
 SAP NetWeaver Capabilities discussions, blogs, documents and videos on the SAP Community Network (SCN)

 
Service-oriented architecture-related products
Portal software